The Family is an American thriller television series. It was created by and executive produced by Jenna Bans, former ShondaLand regular writer, for ABC. The series follows on the return of the mayor's young son, who was presumed dead after disappearing over a decade earlier. The series stars Joan Allen as Claire Warren, the ambitious and manipulative mayor of the fictional city Red Pines, Maine, and matriarch of the Warren family, who announces her candidacy for governor when her son Adam, played by Liam James, returns after having been kidnapped 10 years prior. 

The series premiered on ABC on March 3, 2016, before moving to its regular Sunday night timeslot on March 6, 2016. Its last episode aired on May 15, 2016. On May 12, 2016, it was announced that the series had been cancelled by ABC after one season.

Cast and characters

Main
 Joan Allen as Claire Warren, matriarch of the Warren family, and the Republican mayor of the fictional city Red Pines, Maine, who runs for Governor of Maine over the course of the series 
 Alison Pill as Willa Warren, Claire's daughter and press coordinator
 Margot Bingham as Sergeant Nina Meyer, who made her career after putting Hank in jail for Adam's murder. She is having an affair with John Warren
 Liam James as Ben Murphy, who pretends to be Claire's younger son Adam Warren, who returns after previously being kidnapped 10 years ago. 
 Rupert Graves as John Warren, Claire's author husband
 Zach Gilford as Daniel "Danny" Warren, Claire's older son
 Andrew McCarthy as Hank Asher, a registered sex offender and the Warrens' neighbor. He spends ten years in prison for the supposed murder.
 Floriana Lima as Bridey Cruz, a local reporter who has connection to Willa and Danny
 Madeleine Arthur as young Willa Warren
 Rarmian Newton as young Danny Warren

Recurring
Maxwell James as young Adam Warren
Michael Esper as Doug Anderson, the pocked-marked man who kidnapped Adam and Ben.
Zoe Perry as Jane, Doug Anderson's pregnant girlfriend
Matthew Lawler as FBI Agent Gabe Clements
Grant Show as Governor Charlie Lang, Claire's Democratic rival
Judith Ivey as Mrs. Asher
Felix Solis as Gus Flores
Luke Slattery as 'true' Adam Warren
Ana Maria Jomolca as Agent Lisa Davis
Matthew Rashid as Ryan
Armando Riesco as Corey Sanchez
Jessie Mueller as Fran, a good-natured bakeshop employee who meets Hank
Alex Steele as young Bridey Cruz

Episodes

Production

Development and filming
On September 24, 2014, it was announced that ABC bought the original concept of the untitled mystery drama from Grey's Anatomy and Scandal regular writer Jenna Bans. The series is produced by ABC Studios and Mandeville Television; Bans serves as executive producer with David Hoberman, Todd Lieberman and Laurie Zaks. ABC greenlighted the pilot on January 28, 2015.

The pilot episode, directed by Paul McGuigan, began filming on March 12, 2015, in Vancouver, British Columbia. Later episodes began filming in New York City in September 2015.

Casting
Casting advertisement began in February 2015. On February 13, Zach Gilford was the first to be announced as a regular cast member, playing the role of the older brother. On February 19 Liam James was cast in the key role of the young son who was presumed dead. On February 25, it was announced that Margot Bingham was cast as one of the female lead roles, playing a police sergeant. On February 25, it was announced that three-time Oscar nominee Joan Allen will play the leading role of mayor and Warren family matriarch. The show would be her first broadcast series regular role after many years starring in movies. On the same day Alison Pill was cast as the mayor's daughter and campaign manager. Floriana Lima was cast as a young reporter. On March 10 it was announced that Andrew McCarthy will play Warren's former neighbor who spent 10 years in prison for Adam's murder. On March 16, it was announced that Rupert Graves was cast in the final series regular role as Claire Warren's husband.

On October 2, 2015, Grant Show joined the series in the major recurring role as the Democratic governor and Claire's rival.

Reception

Critical response
The Family has received mixed reviews from critics. On the review aggregator website Rotten Tomatoes, 61% of 33 critics' reviews are positive. The website's consensus reads, "The Family takes a confusing, convoluted course to solve its central mystery that few will want to follow, despite a game performance from Joan Allen." Metacritic, which uses a weighted average, assigned the film a score of 58 out of 100, based on 22 critics, indicating "mixed or average reviews". 

The performances of McCarthy, Pill, and Allen were praised by critics. Stacey Ritzen of Uproxx wrote that "the cast all bring their A game, particularly Allen as the ball-busting matriarch and McCarthy, who lends genuine creepiness and dread to the role." Dominic Patten of Deadline Hollywood praised Allen's and Pill's performances, and wrote that Pill "delivers a rooted multi-level performance that is pretty big league unto itself". Ellen Gray of Philadelphia Daily News praised McCarthy's performance, writing that "while we're waiting to be further mystified, there's plenty to see, including McCarthy's scene-stealing performance as a character who might be as misunderstood as Boo Radley, or might truly be the bogeyman of our worst nightmares."

Other critics slammed the writing and casting. Tim Goodman of The Hollywood Reporter called the show, "Poorly written and completely ridiculous." Jeff Jensen of Entertainment Weekly gave it a C−, summarizing it as a "sour, formulaic expression of ABC's penchant for buzzy, 'sticky' potboilers." He wrote that the show delivered a "shallow treatment of material that deserves more maturity, more empathy, more savvy about American culture. It shows capacity for interesting ideas but has only meager, cliché imagination for them."

Ratings

References

External links

2016 American television series debuts
2016 American television series endings
2010s American LGBT-related drama television series
2010s American mystery television series
2010s American political television series
American Broadcasting Company original programming
American political drama television series
American thriller television series
English-language television shows
Lesbian-related television shows
Nonlinear narrative television series
Serial drama television series
Television series about dysfunctional families
Television series by ABC Studios
Television shows filmed in New York (state)
Television shows set in Maine